The Magnificat (Latin for "[My soul] magnifies [the Lord]") is a canticle, also known as the Song of Mary, the Canticle of Mary and, in the Byzantine tradition, the Ode of the Theotokos. It is traditionally incorporated into the liturgical services of the Catholic Church, the Eastern Orthodox churches, and the Anglican Communion. Its name comes from the incipit of the Latin version of the text.

The text of the canticle is taken from the Gospel of Luke where it is spoken by Mary upon the occasion of her Visitation to her cousin Elizabeth. In the narrative, after Mary greets Elizabeth, who is pregnant with John the Baptist, the latter moves within Elizabeth's womb. Elizabeth praises Mary for her faith (using words partially reflected in the Hail Mary), and Mary responds with what is now known as the Magnificat. Some ancient authorities have Elizabeth, rather than Mary, speaking the Magnificat.

The Magnificat is one of the eight most ancient Christian hymns and perhaps the earliest Marian hymn.  Within the whole of Christianity, the canticle is most frequently recited within the Liturgy of the Hours. In Western Christianity, the Magnificat is most often sung or recited during the main evening prayer service: Vespers in the Catholic and Lutheran churches, and Evening Prayer (or Evensong) in Anglicanism. In Eastern Christianity, the Magnificat is always sung at Matins. The Magnificat may also be sung during worship services, especially in the Advent season during which these verses are traditionally read.

Context
Mary's Magnificat, recorded only in Luke's Gospel, is one of four hymns, distilled from a collection of early Jewish-Christian canticles, which complement the promise-fulfillment theme of Luke's infancy narrative. These songs are Mary's Magnificat; Zechariah's Benedictus (1:67–79); the angels' Gloria in Excelsis Deo (2:13–14); and Simeon's  (2:28–32). In form and content, these four canticles are patterned on the "hymns of praise" in Israel's Psalter. In structure, these songs reflect the compositions of pre-Christian contemporary Jewish hymnology. The first stanza displays graphically a characteristic feature of Hebrew poetry—synonymous parallelism—in ascribing praise to God: "my soul" mirrors "my spirit"; "proclaims the greatness" with "has found gladness"; "of the Lord" with "in God my Savior." The balance of the opening two lines bursts out into a dual Magnificat of declaring the greatness of and finding delight in God. The third stanza again demonstrates parallelism, but in this instance, three contrasting parallels: the proud are reversed by the low estate, the mighty by those of low degree, and the rich by the hungry.

Although there is some scholarly discussion of whether the historical Mary herself actually proclaimed this canticle, Luke portrays her as the singer of this song of reversals and the interpreter of the contemporary events taking place. Mary symbolizes both ancient Israel and the Lucan faith-community as the author/singer of the Magnificat.

The canticle echoes several biblical passages, but the most pronounced allusions are to the Song of Hannah, from the Books of Samuel. Scriptural echoes from the Torah, the Prophets, and the Writings complement the main allusions to Hannah's "magnificat of rejoicing". Along with the Benedictus, as well as several Old Testament canticles, the Magnificat is included in the Book of Odes, an ancient liturgical collection found in some manuscripts of the Septuagint.

As with other canticles and psalms, Western liturgical tradition usually adds the doxology known as Gloria Patri to the end of the Magnificat. This is not found in the original text.

Structure
In a style reminiscent of Old Testament poetry and song, Mary praises the Lord in alignment with this structure:

Mary rejoices that she has the privilege of giving birth to the promised Messiah.
She glorifies God for His power, holiness, and mercy.
Mary looks forward to God transforming the world through the Messiah. The proud will be brought low, and the humble will be lifted up; the hungry will be fed, and the rich will go without.
Mary exalts God because He has been faithful to His promise to Abraham (see God's promise to Abraham in ).

Text

Latin and Anglican translation

Roman Catholic translation
Traditional
 My soul doth magnify the Lord,
 And my spirit hath rejoiced in God my Saviour
 Because He hath regarded the humility of his handmaid: for behold from henceforth all generations shall call me blessed.
 Because He that is mighty hath done great things to me, and holy is His name.
 And His mercy is from generation unto generations to them that fear Him.
 He hath shewed might in His arm: He hath scattered the proud in the conceit of their heart.
 He hath put down the mighty from their seat, and hath exalted the humble.
 He hath filled the hungry with good things, and the rich He hath sent empty away.
 He hath received Israel His servant, being mindful of His mercy.
 As He spoke to our fathers; to Abraham and his seed forever.

 Glory be to the Father, and to the Son, and to the Holy Ghost,
 As it was in the beginning is now, and ever shall be, world without end. Amen.

Modern
 My soul proclaims the greatness of the Lord,
 my spirit rejoices in God my Savior,
 for He has looked with favor on His humble servant.

 From this day all generations will call me blessed,
 the Almighty has done great things for me,
 and holy is His Name.

 He has mercy on those who fear Him
 in every generation.

 He has shown the strength of his arm,
 He has scattered the proud in their conceit.

 He has cast down the mighty from their thrones,
 and has lifted up the humble.

 He has filled the hungry with good things,
 and the rich He has sent away empty.

 He has come to the help of His servant Israel
 for He has remembered his promise of mercy,
 the promise He made to our fathers,
 to Abraham and his children for ever.

 Glory to the Father, and to the Son, and to the Holy Spirit,
 as it was in the beginning, is now, and will be for ever.
 Amen, Alleluia.

Greek

The first written variant of the Magnificat was in Koine Greek.

 Μεγαλύνει ἡ ψυχή μου τὸν Κύριον καὶ ἠγαλλίασεν τὸ πνεῦμά μου ἐπὶ τῷ Θεῷ τῷ σωτῆρί μου,
 ὅτι ἐπέβλεψεν ἐπὶ τὴν ταπείνωσιν τῆς δούλης αὐτοῦ. ἰδοὺ γὰρ ἀπὸ τοῦ νῦν μακαριοῦσίν με πᾶσαι αἱ γενεαί,
 ὅτι ἐποίησέν μοι μεγάλα ὁ δυνατός, καὶ ἅγιον τὸ ὄνομα αὐτοῦ, καὶ τὸ ἔλεος αὐτοῦ εἰς γενεὰς καὶ γενεὰς τοῖς φοβουμένοις αὐτόν.
 Ἐποίησεν κράτος ἐν βραχίονι αὐτοῦ, διεσκόρπισεν ὑπερηφάνους διανοίᾳ καρδίας αὐτῶν·
 καθεῖλεν δυνάστας ἀπὸ θρόνων καὶ ὕψωσεν ταπεινούς, πεινῶντας ἐνέπλησεν ἀγαθῶν καὶ πλουτοῦντας ἐξαπέστειλεν κενούς.
 ἀντελάβετο Ἰσραὴλ παιδὸς αὐτοῦ, μνησθῆναι ἐλέους, καθὼς ἐλάλησεν πρὸς τοὺς πατέρας ἡμῶν τῷ Αβραὰμ καὶ τῷ σπέρματι αὐτοῦ εἰς τὸν αἰῶνα.

In Eastern Orthodox worship, the Ode of the Theotokos is accompanied by the following refrain sung between the verses (a sticheron) and a megalynarion, which is the second part of the Axion Estin hymn:
Τὴν τιμιωτέραν τῶν Χερουβὶμ καὶ ἐνδοξοτέραν ἀσυγκρίτως τῶν Σεραφίμ, τὴν ἀδιαφθόρως Θεὸν Λόγον τεκοῦσαν, τὴν ὄντως Θεοτόκον, σὲ μεγαλύνομεν.
('You who are more to be honoured than the Cherubim and incomparably more glorious than the Seraphim, you who, uncorrupted, gave birth to God the Word, in reality the God-bearer, we exalt you.')
Amharic

In the Oriental Orthodox Church Scripture of Ethiopia according to the Ye' Luqas Wongel, Gospel of Luqas (Luke):

46፤ ማርያምም እንዲህ አለች።

47፤ ነፍሴ ጌታን ታከብረዋለች፥ መንፈሴም በአምላኬ በመድኃኒቴ ሐሴት ታደርጋለች፤

48፤ የባሪያይቱን ውርደት ተመልክቶአልና። እነሆም፥ ከዛሬ ጀምሮ ትውልድ ሁሉ ብፅዕት ይሉኛል፤

49፤ ብርቱ የሆነ እርሱ በእኔ ታላቅ ሥራ አድርጎአልና፤ ስሙም ቅዱስ ነው።

50፤ ምሕረቱም ለሚፈሩት እስከ ትውልድና ትውልድ ይኖራል።

51፤ በክንዱ ኃይል አድርጎአል፤ ትዕቢተኞችን በልባቸው አሳብ በትኖአል፤

52፤ ገዥዎችን ከዙፋናቸው አዋርዶአል፤ ትሑታንንም ከፍ አድርጎአል፤

53፤ የተራቡትን በበጎ ነገር አጥግቦአል፤ ባለ ጠጎችንም ባዶአቸውን ሰዶአቸዋል።

54-55፤ ለአባቶቻችን እንደ ተናገረ፥ ለአብርሃምና ለዘሩ ለዘላለም ምሕረቱ ትዝ እያለው እስራኤልን ብላቴናውን ረድቶአል።

Slavonic
The translation of the hymn into Church Slavonic is as follows:

Liturgical use

The text forms a part of the daily office in the Roman Catholic Vespers service, the Lutheran Vespers service, and the Anglican services of Evening Prayer, according to both the Book of Common Prayer and Common Worship. The Book of Common Prayer allows for an alternative to the Magnificat—the Cantate Domino, Psalm 98—and some Anglican rubrics allow for a wider selection of canticles, but the Magnificat and  remain the most popular. In Anglican, Lutheran, and Catholic services, the Magnificat is generally followed by the Gloria Patri. It is also commonly used among Lutherans at the Feast of the Visitation (July 2).

In Eastern Orthodox liturgical practice, the Magnificat is always sung during the Matins service before the Irmos of the ninth ode of the canon. After each biblical verse, i.e. as a sticheron, the following megalynarion or troparion is sung:

More honourable than the Cherubim, and more glorious beyond compare than the Seraphim, without corruption thou gavest birth to God the Word: true Theotokos, we magnify thee.

As a canticle, the Magnificat has frequently been set to music. Most compositions were originally intended for liturgical use, especially for Vesper services and celebrations of the Visitation, but some are also performed in concert.

Musical settings

As the Magnificat is part of the sung Vespers, many composers, beginning in the Renaissance, set the words to music, for example Claudio Monteverdi in his Vespro della Beata Vergine (1610). Henry Dumont, Marc-Antoine Charpentier, 10 settings (H.72, H.73, H.74, H.75, H.76, H.77, H.78, H.79, H.80, H.81), Vivaldi composed a setting of the Latin text for soloists, choir, and orchestra, as did Johann Sebastian Bach in his Magnificat (1723, rev. 1733). Other notable examples include C.P.E. Bach's Magnificat and two extant settings by Jan Dismas Zelenka (ZWV 106 is missing).

Anton Bruckner composed a Magnificat for soloists, choir, orchestra, and organ. Rachmaninoff and, more recently, John Rutter also composed a setting, inserting additions into the text.

Dieter Schnebel wrote a Magnificat in 1996/97 for small choir (schola), percussion and additional instruments ad libitum. Arvo Pärt composed a setting for choir a cappella. Kim André Arnesen's Magnificat for choir, strings, piano, and organ premiered in 2010. The Taizé Community have also composed an ostinato setting of the text.

The "Mag and Nunc" has been set by many composers – such as Thomas Tallis, Ralph Vaughan Williams, Herbert Sumsion, Charles Wood and John Tavener – of Anglican church music, often for choir a cappella or choir and organ. Since the canticles are sung every day at some cathedrals, Charles Villiers Stanford wrote a Magnificat in every major key, and Herbert Howells published 18 settings over his career, including the Collegium Regale setting and the Magnificat and Nunc dimittis for St Paul's Cathedral.

An Eastern Orthodox setting of the Magnificat (text in Latin and English) is to be found in the 2011 All-night Vigil (Section 11) by the English composer Clive Strutt.

Maria Luise Thurmair wrote in 1954 the lyrics for a popular German ecumenical hymn based on the Magnificat, "Den Herren will ich loben", set to a 1613 melody by Melchior Teschner (that of Valet will ich dir geben). Krzysztof Penderecki composed an extended Magnificat for the 1200th anniversary of the Salzburg Cathedral in 1974, for bass soloist, men's and boys' voices, two mixed choirs and orchestra.

The oratorio Laudato si' composed in 2016 by Peter Reulein on a libretto by Helmut Schlegel includes the full Latin text of the Magnificat, expanded by writings of Clare of Assisi, Francis of Assisi and Pope Francis.

Society and politics

In Nicaragua, the Magnificat is a favorite prayer among many peasants and is often carried as a sacramental. During the Somoza years, campesinos were required to carry proof of having voted for Somoza; this document was mockingly referred to as a Magnificat.

See also
 4Q521, one of the Dead Sea Scrolls

References

Citations

Sources

External links

 "The 'Merciless' Magnificat": A Magnificat reflection by Father Johann Roten, S.M., University of Dayton's Marian Library/International Marian Research Institute. The Marian Library/IMRI is the world's largest repository of books, artwork and artifacts devoted to Mary and a pontifical center of research and scholarship.
 The Magnificat
 Exegesis and Sermon Study of Luke 1:46–55: The Magnificat, by Curtis A. Jahn
 ChoralWiki: Magnificat
 Officium pro defunctis, following the unrevised Vulgate text

Canticles
Catholic liturgy
Christian prayer
Gospel of Luke
Latin-language Christian hymns
Marian devotions
Marian hymns
Vulgate Latin words and phrases